Charles Juseret (28 April 1892 – 4 September 1973) was a Belgian racing cyclist. He rode in the 1919 Tour de France.

References

1892 births
1973 deaths
Belgian male cyclists
Place of birth missing